Cour-Cheverny is a commune in the Loir-et-Cher department, Centre-Val de Loire region, France. The commune's land extends across the Loire Valley and across the Sologne region. Its inhabitants are known as Courchois.

Toponymy
 The name Cour-Cheverny has its origins in the vulgar Latin word, curtis, meaning farm. It seems likely, then, that the village of Cour-Cheverny was once a large piece of land belonging to the nearby village of Cheverny.
Over the years the village has had other names, such as Cour-en-Sologne, the name by which it was known up until the 19th century.
 The church was mentioned in 1145 as belonging to the Abbey of Bourgmoyen.  It came under the diocese of Chartres at the time.  Cour-Cheverny would have been a curtis, or farm, near to the small town of Cheverny, which began to grow in size and importance in the 6th century.

Sights
 The Château of Sérigny, la Sistière, Beaumont, Chantreuil, les Murblins, and la Taurie.
 La Borde is a renowned psychiatric clinic offering institutional psychotherapy treatments
 The 12th-century church of Saint-Aignan, which was altered in the 16th and 17th centuries, has a nave with two bays, two aisles, a semi-circular apse, arcades of two-centred pointed arches, ribbed vaulting with a keystone dating from 1609, an east-facing great door and a tall framed spire on a central bell tower.
 The Chapel of Sérigny.
 The Oratory of la Boide.
 The Conon Valley.
 The Beuvron, a 115 km long tributary of the Loire, that runs into the Loire at Candé-sur-Beuvron.

Population

Economy

Wine 
The Cour Cheverny Appellation d'Origine Contrôlée (AOC) was recognized in 1997. Geographically it corresponds to the commune of Cour-Cheverny and 10 other communes in the surrounding area. The single grape variety used is Romorantin, from which a dry, white wine is produced.

The Cheverny AOC, which was also recognized in 1997, covers a wider area but also includes the commune of Cour-Cheverny.  The wines produced under this appellation are dry, white wines (the main grape variety being Sauvignon blanc), and red and rosé wines (the main grape variety being Gamay).

Events
 Weekly market day: Tuesday.
Town's saint's day: Whit Monday;
Town show: Easter and the Sunday following 15 August.
 Saint Vincent's Day, in honour of the patron saint of wine-growers, celebrated on 22 January.
 Bread Festival, first weekend in July.
 Flea Market, first weekend in August.
 Saint Cecilia's Day, in honour of the patron saint of musicians, celebrated on 22 November.

Sports 
 Football
 Tennis
 Table Tennis
 Basketball
 Badminton

There is even a combined sports association that oversees and coordinates 10 different sections (Gymnastics, Badminton, Basketball, Dance School, Football, Judo, Petanque, Table tennis, Shooting and Cycling (Moorland to Lakeside, i.e. off-road)). The association is called the E.S.C.C.C. (Étoile sportive de Cour-Cheverny et Cheverny or Sporting Star of Cour-Cheverny and Cheverny.)

A gymnasium, built in the last ten years, is available for indoor activities.

Personalities
 Paul Renouard, the 19th-century artist, born in Cour-Cheverny
 Jean-François Deniau, a statesman and writer, 1928–2007.
 Alain Souchon, the singer, songwriter and actor

See also
 Communes of the Loir-et-Cher department

References

Communes of Loir-et-Cher